Masoabi Synous Nkoto (born 14 January 1992) is a Mosotho professional footballer who plays as a forward for Georgian club Merani Martvili and the Lesotho national team.

References

1992 births
Living people
Lesotho footballers
Association football forwards
Lioli FC players
Real Kings F.C. players
National First Division players
Lesotho international footballers
Lesotho expatriate footballers
Lesotho expatriate sportspeople in South Africa
Expatriate soccer players in South Africa